Antrocamphin B is an unusual chemical compound isolated from Taiwanofungus camphoratus. Antrocamphin B is a congener of antrocamphin A.

References

Alkyne derivatives
Catechol ethers
Resorcinol ethers
Hydroquinone ethers
Conjugated ketones
Methoxy compounds